Birgerson is a Norwegian surname. Notable people with this name include:

 Malin Birgerson (born 1968), Swedish actress
 Magnus Birgerson (1300–1320), son and heir of Birger, King of Sweden
 Jon Birgerson (12th-century), Archibishop of Nidaros, in the Roman Catholic Archdiocese of Nidaros, Norway
 Hans Birgerson Wergeland (1861–1931), Norwegian politician
 Eric Birgerson (14th-century), son of Birger, King of Sweden
 Bengt Birgersson (1254–1291), Bishop and Duke of Finland

See also

 Birger (given name)
 Birgir (given name)
 Birgersson (surname; Swedish surname)
 Birgisson (surname; Icelandic surname)

Norwegian-language surnames